Mariya Stepanivna Humenyuk (Ukrainian: Марія Степанівна Гуменюк) was a Soviet politician.

Humenyuk was a member of the Supreme Council of the Soviet Union.

References

Soviet politicians
1914 births
1995 deaths
Recipients of the Order of Lenin
Heroes of Socialist Labour